Shangri-La is an anime series adapted from the light novel of the same title by Eiichi Ikegami and Ken'ichi Yoshida. The series was produced by Gonzo, directed by Makoto Bessho, written by Hiroshi Ōnogi, and featured character designs by Range Murata. The story is set in the mid-21st century when a carbon emission trading market has been imposed in order to mitigate the effects of global warming. After an earthquake devastates much of Japan, Tokyo is turned into the world's largest "jungle-polis" in order to absorb carbon dioxide emissions.

It was the first serialized work published in Newtype magazine to be animated for television. The series premiered on April 6, 2009 on Chiba TV. The first compilation DVD was released by Kadokawa Entertainment on July 24, 2009. The Internet streaming media service Crunchyroll also aired the series on simulcast with episodes airing one hour after they were released in Japan. On April 6, 2012, Funimation Entertainment acquires the rights to the series.

The anime has three pieces of theme music; one opening theme and two ending themes.

Episode list

Volume DVDs
Japanese distributor Kadokawa Entertainment released a total of twelve DVD compilations of Shangri-La between July 24, 2009, and June 25, 2010. A limited version release was also available for the first volume that included a guide book to the series, illustrations by character designer Range Murata, and a storage box for all twelve DVD volumes.

References

General
 

Specific

External links
Shangri-La official website (Archived) 

Shangri-La